The Sylvester Local News is a historic newspaper company in Sylvester, Worth County, Georgia. It is the oldest business in Worth County. The paper's brick building was constructed in the 1920s was individually listed on the National Register of Historic Places (NRHP) on August 21, 1980 as the Worth County Local Building. It is located at 118 North Isabella Street.

The newspaper business was established in 1884 as the Sumner Free Trader. The paper later changed its name to the Worth County Local. It then became the Sylvester Local and it is now the Sylvester Local News. It houses a linotype machine and other printing equipment. The building is open to the public.

The building is also a contributing building in the NRHP-listed Sylvester Commercial Historic District.

In 2016 the entire archival collection of the newspaper was scanned and uploaded for public access by the Maragaret Jones Library of the Worth County Library System.

See also
National Register of Historic Places listings in Worth County, Georgia

References

External links
Sylvester Local News website

Commercial buildings on the National Register of Historic Places in Georgia (U.S. state)
Buildings and structures in Worth County, Georgia
National Register of Historic Places in Worth County, Georgia
Historic district contributing properties in Georgia (U.S. state)